Party Time is an album by saxophonist Arnett Cobb recorded in 1959 for the Prestige label.

Reception
The Allmusic review awarded the album 4 stars and stated "most of the focus is on Cobb's tough yet flexible tenor... Highly recommended".

Track listing 
All compositions by Arnett Cobb except as indicated
 "When My Dreamboat Comes Home" (Dave Franklin, Cliff Friend) - 5:48  
 "Lonesome Road" (Gene Austin, Nathaniel Shilkret) - 3:57  
 "Blues in the Closet" (Oscar Pettiford) - 4:20  
 "Party Time" - 5:55  
 "Flying Home" (Benny Goodman, Lionel Hampton, Eddie DeLange, Sid Robin) - 5:14  
 "The Slow Poke" - 6:52  
 "Cocktails for Two" (Sam Coslow, Arthur Johnston) - 5:14

Personnel 
 Arnett Cobb - tenor saxophone
 Ray Bryant - piano
 Wendell Marshall - bass
 Art Taylor - drums
 Ray Barretto - congas

References 

Arnett Cobb albums
1959 albums
Albums produced by Esmond Edwards
Albums recorded at Van Gelder Studio
Prestige Records albums